The Shoal Lake Cree Nation ( pâhkwâw-sâkahikanihk) is a Swampy Cree First Nations band government in Saskatchewan, Canada located  east of Nipawin. The Cree First Nation is on the Carrot River and can be accessed by  Highway 55. Nearby to the west is the Red Earth First Nation.

Demographics
The total registered population was 1,081 as of October, 2018 with 889 members living on reserve.

Government
Through a Custom Electoral System the members elect a Chief and 4 councillors. The band office is located in the settlement of Pakwaw Lake on the reserve.

Education
The Wacihk Education Complex in Pakwaw Lake offers kindergarten to grade 12 to about 220 students.

References 

First Nations governments in Saskatchewan
Cree governments
Swampy Cree